Danger is a lack of safety and may refer to:

Places
 Danger Cave, an archaeological site in Utah
 Danger Island, Great Chagos Bank, Indian Ocean
 Danger Island, alternate name of Pukapuka Atoll in the Cook Islands, Pacific Ocean
 Danger Islands, Antarctica
 Danger Point, a coastal feature and cliff face in Devon, England
 Point Danger (Portland), Victoria, Australia
 Point Danger (Torquay), Victoria, Australia
 Point Danger (Tweed Heads), on the border of New South Wales and Queensland, Australia

People
 Danger (musician) (born 1984), stage name of French electronic musician Franck Rivoire
 Danger Quintana (born 1994), Cuban former volleyball player
 Danger, South African musician in the kwaito group Big Nuz

Films and television
 Danger (TV series), a 1950s live drama anthology TV series
 Danger (2005 film), a 2005 film written and directed by Krishna Vamsi starring Allari Naresh
 Danger, a 2005 film written by Ajay Sastry
 Danger (2022 film), a recent horror thriller film

Music

Groups and labels
 Danger Danger, an American hard rock band

Albums
 Danger (album), a 2009 album by P-Square
 Danger Danger (album), a 1989 self-titled album 
 Danger! (EP), an EP by The Sound of Arrows

Songs
 "Danger" (The Motels song), 1980
 "Danger" (Sharon O'Neill song), 1983
 "Danger" (The Flirts song), 1983
 "Danger" (AC/DC song), 1985
 "Danger" (Blahzay Blahzay song), 1993
 "Danger (Been So Long)" by Mystikal, 2000
 "Danger" (Erykah Badu song), 2003
 "Danger" (Katie Underwood song), 2003
 "Danger" (Migos and Marshmello song), 2017
 "Danger" by Hilary Duff from Dignity, 2007
 "Danger" by Third Eye Blind from Out of the Vein

Literature
 Danger (comics), the physical manifestation of X-Men's self-aware Danger Room software
 "Danger!" (short story), a 1914 story by Arthur Conan Doyle

Companies
 Danger (company), a Microsoft subsidiary which made cellular telephones
 High Voltage Software, an American video game developer
 Nebraska Danger, an Indoor Football League team based in Grand Island, Nebraska

See also 
 Danger Island (disambiguation)
 Dangerous (disambiguation)
 Dangers (disambiguation)
 Point Danger (disambiguation)